In Chinese mythology, Peaches of Immortality ( or ) are consumed by the immortals due to their mystic virtue of conferring longevity on all who eat them. Peaches symbolizing immortality (or the wish for a long and healthy life) are a common symbol in Chinese art, appearing in depictions or descriptions in a number of fables, paintings, and other forms of art, often in association with thematically similar iconography, such as certain deities or immortals or other symbols of longevity, such as deer or cranes.

Peach banquets

The Jade Emperor and his wife Xi Wangmu (Queen Mother of the West) ensured the deities' everlasting existence by feasting them with the peaches of immortality. The immortals residing in the palace of Xi Wangmu were said to celebrate an extravagant banquet called the "Feast of Peaches" (or ), celebrated on earth in honor (birthday) of Xi Wangmu on the 3rd day of the 3rd moon month. The immortals wait six thousand years before gathering for this magnificent feast; the peach tree put forth leaves once every thousand years and it required another three thousand years for the fruit to ripen. Statues depicting Xi Wangmu's attendants often held three peaches. And the Eight Immortals crossing the seas to attend the banquet is a popular subject in paintings.

Both the Former Affairs of the Emperor Wu and Records of Diverse Matters record stories where the Queen Mother of the West visited Emperor Wu of Han and offered peaches to him. In the latter account, when the Emperor says he plans to plant the peach stones, the Queen Mother of the West tells him that the trees will bear fruit once every 3,000 years.

Journey to the West
The Peaches of Immortality are a major item featured within the popular fantasy novel Journey to the West. The peaches are first encountered when, in heaven, Sun Wukong is stationed as the Protector of the Peaches. The peach garden include three types of peaches, all of which grant over 3,000 years of life if only one is consumed. The first type blooms every three thousand years; anyone who eats it will become immortal, and their body will become both light and strong. The second type blooms every six thousand years; anyone who eats it will be able to fly and enjoy eternal youth. The third type blooms every nine thousand years; anyone who eats it will become "eternal as heaven and earth, as long-lived as the sun and moon." As the Protector, Sun realizes the effects of the sacred peaches and acts quickly as to consume one, before he runs into trouble when Xi Wangmu arrives to hold a peach banquet for many members of Heaven. Sun Wukong makes himself very small to hide within a peach during the banquet, before consuming more, thus gaining immortality and the abilities that come with the peaches.

Later on, Sun Wukong has a second chance to eat a fruit of immortality. A  tree grows behind a monastery run by a Taoist master and his disciples, though the master is away. Once every 10,000 years, the tree bears 30 of the legendary Man-fruit, which just like newborn babies, complete with sense organs. The man-fruits grant 360 years of life to one who merely smells them and 47,000 years of life to one who consumes them. Fruits of immortality are not seen again after this point in the novel.

Others
Members of the Eight Immortals and the Old Man of the South Pole (a longevity deity) are sometimes depicted carrying a Peach of Immortality.

Because of the stories and the peach's association with long-life, peach is a common decoration (the fruit or an image thereof) on traditional birthday cakes and pastries in China.

See also
 Ambrosia, Greek food of immortality
 Golden apple, Norse food of immortality
 Kunlun Mountain (mythology), the mythological residence of Xi Wangmu; not originally identical with the modern "Mount Kunlun"
 Longevity peach, a pastry representation of Peaches of Immortality
 "The Peach Blossom Spring", a fable of utopia
 Trees in Chinese mythology

Notes

Journey to the West
Trees in religion
Prunus
Mythological food and drink
Mythological plants
Peaches
Taoist immortals